The RIPRNet (Releasable Internet Protocol Router Network) is a TCP/IP based computer network for joint South Korea-US access, analogous to the SIPRNet.

Whereas SIPRNet is the de facto SECRET-level TCP/IP network for general use, RIPR is for information classified as Releasable to the Republic of Korea (South Korea) and US Secret. In other words, RIPR is a secure coalition network for joint ROK-US usage.

Like SIPR and NIPR, it is commonly pronounced "ripper".

See also 
 NIPRNet
 SIPRNet
 JWICS

Notes and references

Wide area networks